RUN and FYVE domain containing 2 (RUFY2) is a protein that in humans is encoded by the RUFY2 gene. The RUFY2 gene is named for two of its domains, the RUN domain and FYVE domains. RUFY2 is a member of the RUFY family of proteins that include RUFY1, RUFY2, RUFY3, and RUFY4. RUFY2 protein has a dynamic role in endosomal membrane trafficking.

Gene 

The human RUFY2 gene is located on the long (q) arm of chromosome 10 at region 21 band 3, from base pair 70,100,864 to base pair 70,167,051 on the reverse strand (Build GRCh37/hg19) (map). The gene produces a 2,080 base pair mRNA. There are 18 predicted exons in the human gene  with 13 alternative transcripts.

Gene neighborhood 
8,180 base pairs upstream of RUFY2 is the protein-coding gene for phenazine biosynthesis-like protein domain containing (PBLD). While 6,770 base pairs downstream from RUFY2 is a DNA2 conserved helicase/nuclease involved in the maintenance of mitochondrial and nuclear DNA stability.

Protein 

The protein of RUFY2 consists of 655 amino acid residues. RUFY2 protein contains a N-terminal RUN domain and a C-terminal FYVE domain with 2 coiled coil domains in between.  The molecular weight of the mature protein is 70.0 kdal with an isoelectric point of 5.494. PHYRE2 protein tertiary structure tool suggests that RUFY2 has 15 alpha helices and the longest helix spanning amino acids 199...512 as seen in the figure to the right. RUFY2 is a soluble protein that localizes to the nucleus and to membranes of early endosomes. RUFY2 protein contains no signal peptide, no DNA/RNA binding sites, no mitochondrial targeting motifs and no peroxisomal targeting signal in the C-terminus. There is no transmembrane domain in RUFY2.

Domains

RUN domain 

The RUN domain is between amino acids 45...168 and consists of the RPIP8, UNC-14, and NESCA proteins. The RUN domain has been shown to have interacting functions with GTPases in the Rap and Rab signal transduction pathways and endosomal membrane trafficking.

DUF972 

Domain of unknown function that is part of a family of hypothetical bacterial sequences pfam06156. It make be linked to the YabA initiation control protein which functions as the chromosomal replication initiation control in bacteria.

PspA/IM30 

The PspA/IM30 family is a negative regulator of sigma54 transcription initiation factor in bacteria.

FYVE domain 

FYVE domain consists of Fab-1, YGL023, Vps27, and EEA1 proteins. Within the FYVE domain there are Zinc finger binding sites that interact with phosphatidylinositol-3-phosphate, to bring target proteins to membrane lipids.

Protein interactions 
The proline rich motif in the FYVE domain of RUFY2 has been shown to have binding activity with the SH3 domain of EPHA3 (Etk) in signal transduction pathways.

Post-translational modifications 

RUFY2 possibly has 6 phosphorylation sites and are located mainly in the DUF972 region.  
RUFY2 also has 6 protein kinase C phosphorylation sites that are located mainly within the FYVE domain.

Other notable modification sites within the protein 
4 Lysine acetylation sites 
4 N-myristolation sites
3 N-glycosylation sites

Homology and evolution 

RUFY2 has 4 paralogs: RUFY3, RUFY1, RUNDC3A, RUNDC3B.

There are 60 orthologs of RUFY2 that have been identified including mammals, some birds, reptiles and fish. RUFY2 is highly conserved among its orthologs but is not present in plants, bacteria, archea or protist.

Species distribution 

The following table lists the homologs of RUFY2.

Clinical significance 

Certain neurodegenerative diseases such as Alzheimer's have been found to have defective endosomal trafficking. Therefore, the involvement of RUFY2 protein domains, RUN and FYVE, may possibly play a role in neurodegenerative diseases such as Alzheimer's.

Expression 

RUFY2 protein has been shown to mainly be expressed in the brain, lung, and testes while microarray expression shows RUFY2 ubiquitous expression.

References 

Protein domains